K Chell F.C. was an English association football club.

History
The club competed in the North West Counties League during the 1990s.

References

Defunct football clubs in England
Defunct football clubs in Staffordshire
Works association football teams in England
North West Counties Football League clubs
West Midlands (Regional) League